"Extraordinary" is a song by American singer-songwriter Liz Phair from her self-titled fourth studio album (2003). It was released to radio as the second single from the album on March 1, 2004, by Capitol Records. The song was written by Phair and the production team the Matrix, which consists of Lauren Christy, Scott Spock, and Graham Edwards. Production on the song was solely helmed by the Matrix. According to Phair, the song is about wanting others to see you for who you are.

Background
"Extraordinary" was written by Phair and the production team the Matrix. The song was inspired by feelings Phair experienced of wanting to be seen for who she really is. Phair explained: "I feel like in my life I've always struggled against being kind of the girl-next-door to people, and always wanting people to see me as maybe having more depth."

Phair described the song as an updated version of "6'1"", a song from Exile in Guyville.

Use in media
The song was featured in the 2004 film Raising Helen. It was also featured in an episode of Charmed, titled "Oh My Goddess!" The song was included on the teen pop compilation Got Hits! 2 as well. The song was included on the soundtrack for Queer Eye for the Straight Guy.

Music video
Two music videos for the song were released. The first features black-and-white footage of Phair singing the song. After the song was featured in the 2004 film Raising Helen, a second music video was made, featuring clones of Phair in front of various backdrops.

Critical reception
The song garnered mixed reviews from music critics, who were dissatisfied with her attempt to go mainstream. Slate'''s Mim Udovitch said that Phair sounds "bogus," while PopMatters called the song "sickeningly effervescent." Some critics were more complimentary towards the song, however. Chuck Klosterman, writing for Spin, praised the song's "authenticity," while AllMusic noted that it was one of its parent album's highlights. Michael Paoletta of Billboard called the song "ultra-catchy" and "oh-so-buoyant".

Commercial performance
Though the song failed to recreate the chart success of past hits "Supernova" and "Why Can't I?" it still managed to chart. It reached number 111 in the US, spending a total of 5 weeks on the "Bubbling Under Hot 100" chart. It also charted on the Mainstream Top 40 chart and the Adult Top 40 chart, on which it spent six months.

Credits and personnel
Credits and personnel are adapted from the Liz Phair'' album liner notes.
 Liz Phair – writer, lead vocals
 The Matrix – writer, producer, arrangement, recording, additional vocals
 Krish Sharma – drum recording
 Serban Ghenea – mixing
 Corky James – guitars
 Victor Indrizzo – drums
 The Wizardz of Oz – additional vocals

Charts

Release history

References

2003 songs
2004 singles
2004 songs
Capitol Records singles
Liz Phair songs
Song recordings produced by the Matrix (production team)
Music videos directed by Phil Harder